The 2019 season will be the fifth ever season of competitive soccer played by the New York Red Bulls II, the reserve team of Major League Soccer's New York Red Bulls. The side will participate in the USL Championship, the second-tier of American soccer.

Current roster

Roster movement

Out

USL Championship

Standings

Matches

On December 19, 2018, the USL announced their 2019 season schedule.
All times are in Eastern time.

USL Cup Playoffs

U.S. Open Cup 

Due to their ownership by a more advanced level professional club, Red Bulls II is one of 13 teams expressly forbidden from entering the Cup competition.

Player statistics

Top scorers

 Updated to matches played on May 18, 2019.

Disciplinary

See also
 2019 USL Championship season

References

New York Red Bulls II seasons
New York Red Bulls II
New York Red Bulls II
New York Red Bulls